Polish singer and songwriter Margaret has recorded songs for five studio albums and two extended plays (EPs), and made several guest appearances on other artists' releases. Majority of her earlier work is in English, which she attributed partly to the fact that her songs sound better when sung in that language. Before her mainstream debut, she recorded songs for television commercials, and released an independent album with her band Margaret J. Project called This Is Margaret (2012).

Margaret was signed by Extensive Music in 2012, and released her first EP All I Need the following year. The EP consisted of six songs and featured her debut single "Thank You Very Much". All the songs from All I Need were later included on her debut studio album Add the Blonde released in 2014. Margaret co-wrote four songs, including the album's third single "Heartbeat". Add the Blonde was reissued in 2016 and contained new songs "Cool Me Down" and "Elephant", as well as Margaret's Polish-language version of Robin Beck's song "First Time" titled "Smak radości" which was used in a Polish Coca-Cola commercial.

Margaret's second studio album Just the Two of Us (2015), recorded in collaboration with Matt Dusk, consisted of jazz standards. Her third studio album, Monkey Business, was released in 2017. It contained her first two original Polish-language songs, "Byle jak" and "Nie chce". A majority of the record was co-written by Margaret. She co-wrote every track on her first Polish-language album, Gaja Hornby (2019), which featured collaborations with Kacezet and Gverilla. Similarly, she co-wrote every track on its follow-up, Maggie Vision (2021), which saw her delve into hip hop.

Songs

See also
 Margaret discography

Notes

References

Margaret
 List